Sonia Marian McGeorge (née Vinal; born 2 November 1964 in Upper Beeding) is a female retired English athlete who specialised in the middle- and long-distance events.

Athletics career
McGeorge represented Great Britain at the 1996 Summer Olympics and 1993 World Championships without qualifying for the final. She won the 1994 AAA Championships 3000 metres title.

She represented England in the 3,000 metres event, at the 1994 Commonwealth Games in Victoria, British Columbia, Canada.

Competition record

Personal bests
Outdoor
1500 metres – 4:10.75 (London 1990)
One mile – 4:33.12 (Gateshead 1994)
3000 metres – 8:51.33 (Split 1990)
5000 metres – 15:29.04 (Hengelo 1996)
Indoor
3000 metres – 8:56.67 (Seville 1991)

References

External links
All-Athletics profile

1964 births
Living people
People from Upper Beeding
British female long-distance runners
English female middle-distance runners
English female long-distance runners
Olympic athletes of Great Britain
Athletes (track and field) at the 1996 Summer Olympics
Commonwealth Games competitors for England
Athletes (track and field) at the 1994 Commonwealth Games
World Athletics Championships athletes for Great Britain